Richard Newcourt may refer to:
 Richard Newcourt (historian) (died 1716), English notary and historian
 Richard Newcourt (cartographer) (died 1679), English topographical draughtsman and cartographer